Roque Germán Burella (born September 24, 1970 in Luján, Buenos Aires) is an Argentine former professional footballer who played as a forward for clubs in Argentina, Chile, Spain and South Africa.

Teams
 Luján 1991–1992
 Manning Rangers 1992–1993
 Leandro N. Alem 1993–1994
 Luján 1994–1995
 Provincial Osorno 1995
 O'Higgins 1996
 Elche 1996–1997
 Deportivo Español 1997–1999
 Villa Mitre 1999–2000

External links
 

1970 births
Living people
People from Luján, Buenos Aires
Sportspeople from Buenos Aires Province
Argentine footballers
Association football forwards
Chilean Primera División players
Manning Rangers F.C. players
Provincial Osorno footballers
O'Higgins F.C. footballers
Elche CF players
Deportivo Español footballers
Villa Mitre footballers
Argentine expatriate footballers
Argentine expatriate sportspeople in South Africa
Expatriate soccer players in South Africa
Argentine expatriate sportspeople in Spain
Expatriate footballers in Spain
Argentine expatriate sportspeople in Chile
Expatriate footballers in Chile